Benkovic, Benkovič, Benković is a surname. Notable people with the surname include:

Federiko Benković (1667–1753), late Baroque painter in Italy
Kristina Lelas Benković
Rok Benkovič (born 1986), Slovenian ski jumper
Stephen J. Benkovic (born 1938), American biochemist